Anthony Durian Kelley  (born January 21, 1987) is an American mixed martial artist who competes in the Bantamweight division. A professional since 2012, he most notably competed in the Ultimate Fighting Championship.

Background
As he entered his teen years, Kelley described his life as diverging into questionable decisions made to impress others while trying to be like others. After a while, friends and family members became concerned, and a friend encouraged the then-19-year-old Kelley to get involved in a local jiu-jitsu class to provide some structure.

Mixed martial arts career

Early career
In 2012, Kelley was one of the young MMA fighters featured in Caged - an MTV reality television series.  The show focused on four prospective MMA fighters in small-town Louisiana.  Kelley was one of the two fighters on the show, alongside Matt Schnell, to later fight professionally.

After going professional in September 2012, Kelley would go on to have a 6–1 record on the regional scene, losing his only bout in a close split decision to fellow future UFC fighter Kevin Aguilar.

Ultimate Fighting Championship
He lost the bout via unanimous decision. This bout earned him a Fight of the Night bonus award 

Kelley faced Ali AlQaisi on October 11, 2020, at UFC Fight Night: Moraes vs. Sandhagen. He won the bout via unanimous decision.

Kelley was scheduled to face Trevin Jones on July 24, 2021, at UFC on ESPN: Sandhagen vs. Dillashaw. However, on July 4, Kelly withdrew from the bout due to unknown reasons.

Kelley faced Randy Costa on December 11, 2021, at UFC 269. He won the fight via TKO in the second round.

Kelley faced Adrian Yanez  on June 18, 2022 at UFC on ESPN 37. At the weigh-ins on June 17, Kelley weighed in at 137.5 pounds, one-and-a-half pounds over the non-title bantamweight limit. As a result, the bout proceeded as a catchweight and Kelley forfeited 20% of his purse to Yanez. He lost the bout in the first round via TKO stoppage.

On July 7, 2022, it was announced that Kelley was no longer on the roster.

Championships and accomplishments 

 Ultimate Fighting Championship
 Fight of the Night (One time)

Legal troubles 
In March 2012, Kelley was charged with simple battery due to a nightclub scuffle in which he allegedly choked a woman for not wanting to dance with him.  He was eventually found not guilty.

Controversies 
Kelley caused controversy at UFC on ESPN: Błachowicz vs. Rakić on May 14, 2022 while cornering Andrea Lee in her fight against Brazilian opponent Viviane Araújo. Referring to an alleged eye poke by Araújo, Kelley said: "That’s what they’re going to do, they’re dirty fucking Brazilians, they’re going to fucking cheat like that." In response to criticism of the comment, Kelley released a statement on Twitter denying any "racist connotations" and claiming to be a victim of "cancel culture".

Mixed martial arts record

|Loss
|align=center|8–3
|Adrian Yanez
|TKO (punches)
|UFC on ESPN: Kattar vs. Emmett
|
|align=center|1
|align=center|3:49
|Austin, Texas, United States
|
|-
| Win
| align=center|8–2
| Randy Costa
| TKO (elbows)
|UFC 269
|
| align=center|2
| align=center|4:15
|Las Vegas, Nevada, United States
|
|-
| Win
| align=center|7–2
| Ali AlQaisi
|Decision (unanimous)
|UFC Fight Night: Moraes vs. Sandhagen
|
|align=center|3
|align=center|5:00
|Abu Dhabi, United Arab Emirates
|
|-
| Loss
| align=center| 6–2
| Kai Kamaka III
|Decision (unanimous)
|UFC 252
|
| align=center| 3
| align=center| 5:00
|Las Vegas, Nevada, United States
|
|-
| Win
| align=center| 6–1
| Andy Brossett
| Submission (guillotine choke)
|Rite of Passage 7
| 
| align=center|1
| align=center|2:33
| Bossier City, Louisiana, United States
| 
|-
| Loss
| align=center| 5–1
| Kevin Aguilar
|Decision (split)
|Legacy FC 57
|
|align=center|5
|align=center|5:00
|Bossier City, Louisiana, United States
|
|-
| Win
| align=center| 5–0
| Levi Mowles
| Decision (split)
| Legacy Kickboxing 2
| 
|align=center|3
|align=center|5:00
| Shreveport, Louisiana, United States
| 
|-
| Win
| align=center| 4–0
| Jordan Winski
| Submission (rear-naked choke)
| World Fighting Federation 19
| 
| align=center| 3
| align=center| 4:08
| Tucson, Arizona, United States
| 
|-
| Win
| align=center| 3–0
| Chris Pham
|Technical Submission (shoulder choke)
|Legacy FC 32
|
|align=center|2
|align=center|4:58
|Shreveport, Louisiana, United States
| 
|-
| Win
| align=center| 2–0
| Kody Thrasher
| TKO (punches)
| Hilia Fights 1
| 
| align=center| 1
| align=center| 3:37
| Kenner, Louisiana, United States
|
|-
| Win
| align=center| 1–0
| Sean Marsicane
| TKO (punches)
| Coalition of Combat
| 
| align=center| 1
| align=center| 2:30
| Phoenix, Arizona, United States
|

See also 
 List of male mixed martial artists

References

External links 
  
 

1987 births
Living people
American male mixed martial artists
Bantamweight mixed martial artists
Mixed martial artists utilizing karate
Mixed martial artists utilizing Brazilian jiu-jitsu
Ultimate Fighting Championship male fighters
American practitioners of Brazilian jiu-jitsu
American male karateka
Sportspeople from Shreveport, Louisiana
Mixed martial artists from Louisiana